Albert Joseph Bradley   (May 23, 1856 – February 5, 1937), was a Major League Baseball outfielder who played in one game on May 21, 1884, for the Washington Nationals of the Union Association.

External links

1856 births
1937 deaths
Major League Baseball outfielders
Baseball players from Pennsylvania
19th-century baseball players
Washington Nationals (UA) players
Altoona (minor league baseball) players